Antoni Wróbel (11 February 1923 – 2 August 1988) was a Polish ice hockey player. He played for Naprzód Janów during his career. He also played for the Polish national team at the 1952 Winter Olympics. Two of his brothers, Adolf and Alfred, also played for Poland at the Olympics; Adolf in 1956, and Alfred in both 1952 and 1956.

References

External links
 

1923 births
1988 deaths
Ice hockey players at the 1952 Winter Olympics
Naprzód Janów players
Olympic ice hockey players of Poland
Polish ice hockey forwards
Sportspeople from Katowice